Cham-e Khorram (also Romanized as Cham-e Khorram and Cham Khorram) is a village in Saman Rural District, Saman County, Chaharmahal and Bakhtiari Province, Iran. At the 2006 census, its population was 160, in 42 families. The village is populated by Turkic people.

References 

Populated places in Saman County